Zitsadegu (Zitsa Degu, Chinese Jiuzhaigou) is a minor eastern Tibetic language of Sichuan spoken by a few hundred or thousand people.

References

Bodic languages
Languages of China